Katarzyna Maria Piekarska (pronounced ; born 23 September 1967 in Warsaw) is a Polish left-wing politician, member of the Democratic Left Alliance.

She is a graduate of the Uniwersytet Warszawski in law.  She worked as a lawyer.

She was elected to the Sejm on 25 September 2005, getting 26511 votes in 19 Warsaw district as a candidate from Democratic Left Alliance list. However, she failed to be elected in the 2007 election.

She was also a member of Sejm 1993–1997, Sejm 1997–2001, and Sejm 2001–2005. During her third term she was a chairman of the Justice and Human Rights commission.

From 2004 to 2005 she was a Vice Chairman of the party and during 2005 Presidential elections a chairman of Włodzimierz Cimoszewicz campaign.

In 2008 she was elected the vice-president of the Democratic Left Alliance despite not being member of the parliament.

She is a well-known advocate of ethical treatment of animals and a vegetarian.  She also writes poems and plays.

See also
Members of Polish Sejm 2005-2007

External links
Official site
Katarzyna Maria Piekarska - parliamentary page - includes declarations of interest, voting record, and transcripts of speeches.

1967 births
University of Warsaw alumni
Living people
Politicians from Warsaw
Democratic Left Alliance politicians
Members of the Polish Sejm 1993–1997
Members of the Polish Sejm 1997–2001
Members of the Polish Sejm 2001–2005
Members of the Polish Sejm 2005–2007
Members of the Polish Sejm 2019–2023
Women members of the Sejm of the Republic of Poland
20th-century Polish women politicians
21st-century Polish women politicians
Polish Initiative